Events during the year 1984 in Northern Ireland.

Incumbents
 Secretary of State - Jim Prior (until 11 September), Douglas Hurd  (from 11 September)

Events
14 March - Sinn Féin MP Gerry Adams is shot and wounded in Belfast.
2 May - The New Ireland Forum publishes its report presenting three possibilities for discussion: a unitary Irish state, a federal/confederal state and joint sovereignty.
18 June - European Parliament elections are held in Northern Ireland and the Republic of Ireland.
1 October - The University of Ulster is presented with a Royal Charter by Elizabeth II. It also absorbs Ulster Polytechnic (at Jordanstown) during the year.
17 October - Foyle Bridge in Derry is officially opened, with the longest span in Ireland.

Arts and literature
Graham Reid's play Remembrance is first produced (10 October) at the Lyric Theatre (Belfast), and his television play A Coming to Terms for Billy, last in the trilogy of "Billy plays", is shown in BBC1's Play for Today series, starring Kenneth Branagh.

Sport

Football
Irish League
Winners: Linfield

Irish Cup
Winners: Ballymena United 4 - 1 Carrick Rangers

Births
22 April - Phillip Magee, singer and The X Factor (British series 2) finalist
5 July - Boyd Rankin, cricketer.
19 July - Neil McCafferty, footballer.
6 September - William Porterfield, cricketer.
20 October - Andrew Trimble, international rugby player.
23 October - Ruaidhri Higgins, footballer.
14 December - Chris Brunt, footballer

Deaths
3 March - Rinty Monaghan, world flyweight boxing champion (born 1920)
6 April - Jimmy Kennedy, songwriter (born (1902).
June - Alec Mackie, soccer player (born 1903).
30 December - William Bedell Stanford, classical scholar and senator (born 1910)

See also
1984 in Scotland
1984 in Wales

References

 
Northern Ireland